Belle is a fictional character in Disney's 30th animated feature film Beauty and the Beast (1991). Voiced by actress and singer Paige O'Hara, Belle, the book-loving daughter of an eccentric inventor, yearns to abandon her predictable village life in return for adventure. When her father Maurice is imprisoned by a cold-hearted beast in an enchanted castle, Belle offers her own freedom in exchange for her father's, and gradually learns to love the Beast despite his outward appearance.

Disney chairman Jeffrey Katzenberg commissioned Beauty and the Beast as an animated musical with a strong heroine, for which he hired first-time screenwriter Linda Woolverton. Basing her on the heroine of the 1740 fairy tale of the same name, Woolverton adapted Belle into a more proactive character for the film, deliberately conceiving her as a feminist to curtail criticisms Disney had long received for purportedly portraying female characters as victims. Inspired by the women's rights movement and actress Katharine Hepburn's performance in the film Little Women (1933), Woolverton created Belle as a unique departure from previous Disney heroines, particularly The Little Mermaids Ariel. However, some story artists often contested Woolverton's liberated vision for the character. Animated by James Baxter and Mark Henn, the former of whom based the character's graceful gait on those of impressionist Edgar Degas' ballerinas, Belle's European facial features were inspired by those of British actresses Vivien Leigh and Audrey Hepburn. Several additional Hollywood actresses inspired Belle's appearance, including Natalie Wood, Elizabeth Taylor, and Grace Kelly. Disney auditioned 500 candidates for the role, before casting O'Hara based on her mature-sounding voice and Broadway experience.

Belle has garnered widespread acclaim from film critics who appreciated the character's bravery, intelligence, and independence. Reception towards her feminism, however, has been more mixed, with commentators accusing the character's actions of being romance-oriented. The fifth Disney Princess, Belle is often ranked among the franchise's best members. Highly regarded as one of Disney's strongest examples of a feminist character, critics agree that Belle helped spearhead a generation of independent film heroines while changing the reputation of a Disney princess. Also one of Disney's most iconic characters, Belle was the only animated heroine nominated for the American Film Institute's greatest heroes in film ranking. The character also appears in the film's several sequels and spin-offs, as well as her own live-action television series. American actress Susan Egan originated the role of Belle in the Broadway musical adaptation of the film, for which she was nominated for a Tony Award for Best Actress in a Musical. Emma Watson played Belle in the 2017 live-action adaptation of the film.

Development

Creation and writing
Shortly after the success of Disney's first feature-length animated film Snow White and the Seven Dwarfs (1937), Walt Disney himself had attempted to adapt the Beauty and the Beast fairy tale into one of the studio's earliest animated films several times, notably during the 1930s and 1950s. The project was continuously shelved due to the fairy tale's "static" main characters and plot, with Walt Disney expressing particular concern over depicting Belle's imprisonment. Inspired by the success of 1989's The Little Mermaid, Disney chairman Jeffrey Katzenberg green-lit another attempt at adapting the fairy tale under director Richard Purdum. However, Katzenberg was dissatisfied with Purdum's dark, somber interpretation, and ultimately ordered that the project be completely retooled into a Broadway-style musical film starring a strong heroine, similar to The Little Mermaid. Largely in retaliation to critics' negative response towards The Little Mermaid's Ariel regarding her overall character and motivations, Disney opted for a "feminist twist" on the original Beauty and the Beast story, with Katzenberg hiring first-time screenwriter Linda Woolverton to write its screenplay.

Disney traditionally portrayed its female characters as victims prior to Beauty and the Beast, with Belle's lack of empowerment in earlier drafts of the film proving contentious among its writers. While the studio wanted Beauty and the Beast to resemble an old-fashioned film, the writers envisioned Belle as "a woman that was ahead of her time". As the first woman to write a feature-length animated film for Disney, Woolverton decided to use Belle as an opportunity to create a female character who would ultimately be better received than Disney's previous animated heroines, specially Ariel. Aware of the task's daunting nature due to the mermaid's popularity, Woolverton fought relentlessly to create "a new kind of Disney heroine". Inspired by the women's rights movement Woolverton herself had experienced, the screenwriter conceived Belle as a headstrong feminist to avoid creating another "insipid" Disney princess. Woolverton strongly believed contemporary audiences would not identify with Belle unless she was updated appropriately, and thus evolved the character into "a woman of the '90s". Refusing to watch Jean Cocteau's 1946 film adaptation of the fairy tale, Woolverton instead based Belle on actress Katharine Hepburn's portrayal of Jo March in the 1933 film adaptation of Louisa May Alcott's book Little Women. Similarly, story artist Brenda Chapman drew influence from Hepburn's on-screen bickering with actor Spencer Tracy for certain scenes with the Beast.

Beauty and the Beast's story department was predominantly male. Woolverton often argued with the more traditional story artists over Belle's role and personality, but continued to be supported by Katzenberg and lyricist Howard Ashman, the latter of whom also lobbied for "a thinker and a reader" who "wasn’t a victim". Woolverton claims the story team challenged virtually everything she wrote for the character, on one occasion replacing what Woolverton had scripted as Belle indicating where she wishes to travel on a map with the character baking a cake. Arguing that the liberated Belle would not even know how to bake, Woolverton compromised by having the character read a book instead, which ironically some writers considered too passive an activity. To resolve this, Woolverton ultimately scripted Belle walking while reading, an activity in which she herself partook in as a child. Despite constant re-writes she found "regressive", Woolverton's overall vision for Belle generally remained intact. 

In the original fairy tale, Belle has two selfish sisters who have their own love interests, all of whom Woolverton omitted to focus on Belle's dynamic with Gaston. The writer also eliminated the subplot surrounding Belle asking her father for a rose. Supporting characters from Purdum's treatment, such as Belle's younger sister Clarice and cruel Aunt Marguerite, were also discarded, the former to emphasize Belle's loneliness, and the latter replaced by Gaston as the film's villain. In Jeanne-Marie Leprince de Beaumont's fairy tale, Belle is essentially forced to replace her father as the Beast's prisoner. To emphasize the character's independence, Woolverton re-wrote Belle to willingly venture to the castle in search of her father, where she confronts the Beast and ultimately trades her own freedom in return for Maurice's. To demonstrate that the character is not perfect, Woolverton described "a little wisp of hair that keeps falling in her face," which was the only direction she used to describe Belle's physical appearance. During Gaston's climactic fight with the Beast, the character's line "Time to die!", which had already been animated, was changed to "Belle is mine!" to refocus the story on Belle.

Voice
Disney auditioned approximately 500 actresses for the role of Belle. They originally considered re-hiring Ariel's voice actress Jodi Benson, but ultimately decided Benson sounded too young and American for the character they had envisioned. Favoring a "more classical ... womanly" tone, the filmmakers wanted Belle to sound closer to a woman than a girl, describing her ideal voice as reminiscent of actress Judy Garland. American actress and singer Paige O'Hara was working on Broadway when she first read about Disney's then-upcoming animated film Beauty and the Beast in The New York Times. Upon learning that the studio was specifically scouting Broadway performers for the lead female role, O'Hara immediately booked an audition through her agent. Familiar with O'Hara's Broadway stint in the musical Show Boat, Ashman had already been eyeing her for the role. O'Hara auditioned five times, first solely interviewing for casting director Albert Taveres. For her next two auditions, she was simply required to mail voice recordings to Disney's studio in Los Angeles, for which she sang "Heaven Help My Heart" from the musical Chess. At her first legitimate in-person audition, O'Hara originally spoke and sang in a higher register than her own in an effort to mimic Snow White, but the filmmakers insisted that she use her own voice. In addition to Katzenberg and Ashman, O'Hara's last few auditions were attended by directors Kirk Wise and Gary Trousdale, producer Don Hahn, and composer Alan Menken. The songwriters initially listened with their eyes closed before finally watching her audition. An hour after her fifth and final audition, Disney telephoned O'Hara to inform her she had been cast as Belle, which happened to occur on her birthday. The actress was fairly confident she had secured the role before she had officially been cast, to which she credits Ashman's enjoyment of her vocal performance on the Show Boat cast recording.

Already 30 years-old by the time of her audition, O'Hara naturally imbued Belle's voice with a mature quality, despite her character's young age. Woolverton appreciated O'Hara for sounding more mature than traditional Disney heroines, while the quality of her voice reminded Wise of Garland. In addition to sharing Belle's love of reading, O'Hara empathized with her character's ostracization by her peers due to her unconventional interests, explaining, "I was into musical theater ... while people were going to Led Zeppelin concerts ... I had a one-track mind, and I think that Belle was like that a lot". The actress worked on the film on-and-off for over two years, and initially found it challenging to soften her voice during recording sessions due to having been trained to project as a stage actress. O'Hara and actor Robby Benson, voice of the Beast, sought permission from Disney to record in the same booth as opposed to separately, which the studio agreed to despite its costliness, ultimately becoming the first voice actors to do so for Disney. O'Hara credited the intimate recording sessions with helping Belle and the Beast's relationship sound more convincing. Although the actress would occasionally ad-lib her dialogue per the directors' encouragement, none of her improvisation was included in the final film because it sounded "too modern". Despite her successful stage career, O'Hara was virtually unknown to Hollywood audiences when she was cast in Beauty and the Beast; she was one of the last obscure actresses to be cast in a feature-length Disney animated film before the studio began casting better-known talent in subsequent animated projects.

Since the film's 1991 release, O'Hara has reprised the role in a variety of follow-up films, tie-in media, and merchandise, including its direct-to-video sequels Beauty and the Beast: The Enchanted Christmas (1997), Belle's Magical World (1998), and Belle's Tales of Friendship (1999); various video games such as the Kingdom Hearts series; and several music and video releases for the Disney Princess franchise. Additionally, O'Hara performed the song "Belle" at the 64th Academy Awards in 1992, where it had been nominated for an Academy Award for Best Original Song. In 2012, O'Hara described Disney as her "main employer for 20 years". In 2011, O'Hara was officially replaced by actress Julie Nathanson, who first voiced Belle in the video game Kinect: Disneyland Adventures (2011). O'Hara revealed to the Las Vegas Review-Journal that news of the replacement greatly upset her to the point of which she was willing to re-record much of Belle's dialogue in an attempt to prove to the company that she is still capable of voicing the character. However, O'Hara eventually admitted that she found the process quite difficult as a result of the way in which her voice has changed over the course of 20 years. O'Hara eventually returned to voice Belle in the film Ralph Breaks the Internet (2018).

Personality
According to producer Don Hahn, Beaumont's Belle is an "incredibly passive" character, the personality of whom he likened to those of Aurora from Sleeping Beauty (1959) and Cinderella, as well as American actress and animal rights activist Doris Day, describing them as women who are "capable, but filling a role that women might fill in the 1950s and 1960s.” The filmmakers painstakingly reworked Belle into a more three-dimensional character by providing her with goals and aspirations beyond romance and marriage, while expanding her passive role into that of a more inquisitive heroine. Determined to have Belle resemble "an unusual Disney heroine," Woolverton deliberately molded her into an independent character who is not a princess, enjoys books and has little interest in marriage, and worked closely with Ashman to create a proactive heroine "who was a thinker and a reader and she wasn't about what she looked like and she wasn't a victim." Although Belle being well-read is mentioned in the original fairy tale, it is hardly important to its plot. Thus, Belle's passion for reading was vastly expanded upon, borrowing from both the Little Women character Jo March and Woolverton's own love of reading to further demonstrate the character's intelligence and open mind. Both Woolverton and O'Hara encouraged the filmmakers to emphasize the intelligent and book-loving aspects of Belle's personality. However, at times the animators struggled to fulfill Woolverton's vision. Originally, Belle was depicted constantly crying throughout her imprisonment; Woolverton resented this, arguing that the character was much more likely to be either searching for an escape or simply "be intrigued that she was living in an enchanted castle" than crying. "Once everybody realized she wasn't going to be this typical Disney female, they would go to the extreme ... She became bitchy"; the screenwriter argued that Belle would be "too smart" to act this way. A few years older than The Little Mermaids Ariel, Belle's love of reading makes the character more worldly and mature than her predecessor. Belle is believed by Henn to be "probably" the oldest of Disney's princesses. Although multiple sources have claimed over the years that the character is 17, Henn estimated Belle to be in her early 20’s. In an interview for Vanity Fair, Paige O’Hara stated to believe that Belle was the only Disney princess to be in her 20’s. The official Disney Princesses (which Belle is part of), however, are estimated to be not older than 19, with Cinderella and Tiana being the oldest members in the official Disney Princesses line-up and franchise, being both estimated to be 19.

Design and animation
Belle's supervising animators were James Baxter and Mark Henn. Wanting Belle to look significantly different from and more European than Ariel, the animators drew Belle with fuller lips, narrower eyes, and darker eyebrows, which were inspired by British actress Vivien Leigh. Appearing more statuesque than traditional Disney princesses, Belle was also inspired by Jennie Garth and Alyssa Milano. According to the Directory of World Cinema: American Hollywood by Lincoln Geraghty, Belle was inspired by actress Judy Garland's role as Dorothy Gale in The Wizard of Oz (1939) and Julie Andrews' performance as Maria von Trapp in The Sound of Music (1965).

Belle was Henn's second Disney heroine, after having previously worked on Ariel. He was specifically assigned to animate scenes from the studio's Florida division, and has since animated several Disney princesses since completing Beauty and the Beast. Henn observed that, unlike Ariel, Belle does not "fall in love at first sight"; instead "there's an actual relationship you see grow". Henn decorated his studio with photographs of famous women, specifically Hollywood actresses Natalie Wood, Elizabeth Taylor, Grace Kelly, and Audrey Hepburn, for reference. Henn claims Belle's appearance started to form once O'Hara was cast and he heard her voice, from which point they married her performance with the designs they had already been conceiving. O'Hara found herself intimated by the photographs of "all these beautiful women", but animator Lorna Cook reassured her that they would reference her own photo as well. Henn hardly met O'Hara apart from rare occasions when he would travel to California for production meetings. Meanwhile, the animators dissuaded O'Hara from seeing drawings of the character until much later into production, encouraging the actress to simply let the animators draw her.

Baxter based his drawings on the work story artists Roger Allers and Brenda Chapman had already done for the character, deciding to draw Belle with a rounder face in addition to making her more European-looking. They decided the character should definitely be a brunette, a hair color Disney had seldom used since Snow White. Baxter studied the art of French impressionist Edgar Degas, a painter known for his portraits of ballerinas, whose work inspired the animator to incorporate "graceful, swan-like movements" into Belle's performance. Belle's ball gown was inspired by a similar costume Audrey Hepburn wore in Roman Holiday (1953). Hahn and a team of male filmmakers designed the gown while consuming pizza and alcohol. Originally, the marketing department ordered that Belle's dress be pink to cater to the female audience, but art director Brian McEntee convinced studio to make the dress gold in order to differentiate her from other Disney princesses, specifically Aurora from Sleeping Beauty. McEntee also suggested that Belle be the only character in her village to wear blue, so as to emphasize the fact that she is different and an outcast. The colors Belle wears also mimic her emotions, blue being associated with sadness and loneliness. Blue was also used to symbolize good, while Gaston's red represents evil.

Animators videotaped O'Hara's recording sessions to capture her mannerisms, expressions, and gestures, such as her hair's tendency to fall into her face, which they incorporated into her character's drawings. O'Hara claims some of her family members immediately recognized O'Hara's physical traits in Belle upon watching the film for the first time. Actress and model Sherri Stoner served as the performance model for Belle, providing live-action reference for the animators as they drew the character. Belle's tendency to constantly brush her hair away from her face was also inspired by both Stoner and O'Hara. The animators also incorporated O'Hara's eyes, cheekbones and the way in which she raises her eyebrow into Belle's face. O'Hara felt that Belle originally looked "too perfect", comparing her to actress Angelina Jolie, although Jolie would not make her film debut until four year later. O'Hara initially feared children would not be able to relate to her until the animators made her appear less perfect. Writing for the Los Angeles Times, Charles Solomon observed inconsistencies in Belle's appearance, stating, "The prettiest and liveliest Belle waltzes with Beast in his marble ballroom and weeps over his body before he's transformed into the Prince" while "The Belle who receives the library from Beast has wider-set eyes and a more prominent mouth than the noticeably slimmer Belle who sings 'Something There.'"

Characterization and themes
Woolverton created Belle as part of "her self-directed mandate to move women and girls forward." The Express-Times described the character as an intelligent young woman who "sings songs about reading and wanting to gain knowledge, rather than falling in love." Woolverton credits Belle's knowledge and love of books with providing the character with a "point of view of her life and that doesn't necessarily involve a man getting her there." One of the film's main themes, Belle is considered an outsider because her love of reading provides her with knowledge of the outside world as opposed to her "narrow-minded" village peers. Writing for Wired.com, Matt Blum dubbed Belle "the geekiest heroine of any Disney animated film", exemplified by an opening number that demonstrates just how much she does not fit in with her peers due to her intelligence and active imagination. Similarly, Boxoffices Amy Nicholson coined the character "Disney's Smartest Heroine," while Rob Burch of The Hollywood News observed that the character "comes across as arrogant at times" because she "spends much of the first act complaining." In her book Sex, Love and Abuse: Discourses on Domestic Violence and Sexual Assault, author Sharon Hayes described Belle as "the quintessential beautiful young ingénue." Comparing Belle's personality to that of the princess in the Brothers Grimm's fairy tale "The Frog Prince," The Meanings of "Beauty and the Beast": A Handbook author Jerry Griswold described the character as a similarly "feisty and outspoken" heroine. Writing for St. Francis Xavier University, Dawn Elizabeth England observed that Belle possesses equally as many traditionally feminine as she does masculine traits, citing her bravery, independence and assertiveness as masculine, and her sensitivity and fearfulness as feminine. According to Hard Bodies: Hollywood Masculinity in the Reagan Era author Susan Jeffords, "Belle's credentials as heroine are established ... when she is the only one of the town's single women not to swoon over Gaston," while the character's love of reading is essentially manipulated "to mark her as better than the rest of the townspeople." Writing for The Statesman, David O'Connor cited Belle's intelligence and bibliophilia as "in stark opposition to the insensitive and significantly dim-witted Gaston." Critics continue to debate over whether Belle or the Beast is the film's protagonist. Susan Jeffords, author of Hard Bodies: Hollywood Masculinity in the Reagan Era, felt that although Belle appears to be the protagonist in Beaumont's original fairy tale, the character becomes "less the focus of the narrative" in Disney's adaptation and more of a "mechanism for solving the Beast's 'dilemma.'" In her article "The Tangled Evolution of the Disney Princess," Noelle Buffam felt that Belle arrived just in time when Disney's heroines were "in a dire need for some change," awarding her "the red stamp of approval" for her intelligence and spirit.

Analyzing ways in which Disney's heroines have evolved over time due to "the approach to the characterization of the princesses chang[ing]" as the characters gradually transformed from passive young women into heroines who "had ambitions and desires aside from finding true love," critics often divide the Disney Princesses into three separate categories and rank Belle among the middle of the timeline, with Kit Steinkellner of HelloGiggles.com observing that the character improved upon "the Disney princess archetype" by simultaneously serving as both a "dreamer" and a "doer" in her film, as opposed to exclusively the former. Film historian Paula Sigman Lowery explained to the Daily Express that Belle's personality is a combination of Ariel's spirit and burgeoning independence, and Pocahontas' maturity, while Belle is "a little older [than Ariel] and a little further along in their journey towards independence." About.com's David Nusair believes that Belle belongs to a category of Disney Princesses known as "The Lady Vanishes," in which the heroines, in spite of being brave, outspoken and independent, nonetheless "are forced to behave passively as others help them achieve their respective goals." Michelle Munro, writing for Durham College, felt that even though Belle shares several traits with her more passive predecessors, the character introduced "new possibilities for princesses." Girls in Capes wrote that Belle pioneered a generation of princesses who taught "about ambition, self-discovery and the pursuit of what we want." Additionally, Belle remains Disney's first and only princess to have hazel eyes.

Appearances

Film and television
Belle debuted in Beauty and the Beast (1991) as a beautiful bibliophile who, although praised by her fellow villagers for her unrivaled beauty, is at the same time ridiculed for her intelligence and non-conformity. Having grown weary of her uneventful provincial life, in which she is relentlessly romantically pursued by an arrogant hunter named Gaston, Belle longs for adventure. After her father's horse returns without its rider, she willingly ventures into the woods in search of her father. She persuades the Beast that she will trade her own freedom in return for her father's, since her father is ill in the dungeon, promising to remain with the Beast in his castle among his staff of enchanted objects forever. Belle's curiosity leads her to the forbidden west wing where she discovers an enchanted rose without realizing that it is tied to the Beast's fate; and the Beast's rage at her trespassing causes her to flee the castle on horseback. Belle is pursued by wolves in the woods but they are driven off by the Beast, afterwards Belle helps the injured Beast back to the castle and nurses him back to health. Although she initially dislikes her captor, Belle gradually learns to accept the Beast in spite of his appearance and eventually befriends him. Belle and the Beast's strong bond greatly envies Gaston to the point of which he storms the castle and mortally wounds the Beast, though Gaston falls to his own death in the process. However, Belle breaks down and confesses her love for the Beast just in time to break the spell under which he had been placed by an enchantress as punishment for his selfish ways, and the Beast ultimately transforms back into a handsome prince.

In Beauty and the Beast: The Enchanted Christmas (1997), Belle attempts to reignite the castle's waning spirit by reintroducing and celebrating Christmas, in spite of the Beast's strong resentment towards the holiday. Meanwhile, a solemn pipe organ named Forte grows determined to sabotage Belle and the Beast's burgeoning friendship because he longs to maintain his co-dependent relationship with his master. Tricked by Forte into retrieving a large Christmas tree from a frozen pond, Belle nearly drowns, only to be rescued by the Beast. The Beast, however, having been misinformed by Forte, wrongly accuses Belle of trying to escape again, and locks her in the dungeon as punishment. When the Beast finally discovers the truth, they forgive each other, and Belle helps him thwart Forte's plan to destroy the castle. Belle's Magical World (1998), depicts Belle as she interacts with both the Beast and his enchanted servants in various segments, exploring themes such as forgiveness, friendship, cooperation and respect.

In Belle's Tales of Friendship (1999), a spin-off of the film series, Belle owns a bookshop in which she teaches valuable lessons to children by reading and retelling well-known stories and fairy tales, narrating four Disney animated shorts: The Three Little Pigs (1933), Peter and the Wolf (1946), The Wise Little Hen (1934), and Morris the Midget Moose (1950). For the first time, Belle appears as both animated and live-action versions of herself, voiced and portrayed by actresses Paige O'Hara and Lynsey McLeod, respectively. In the television series Sing Me a Story with Belle (1995–97), Belle, in a role reprised by McLeod, runs her own music and bookshop, where she is visited by children to whom she tells and sings stories.

Belle appeared in the animated television series House of Mouse and its direct-to-video films Mickey's Magical Christmas: Snowed in at the House of Mouse and Mickey's House of Villains. In the television series, Belle is voiced by American actress and singer Jodi Benson, while O'Hara reprised her role in Magical Christmas.

A live-action version of Belle appears as a main character in the ABC television series Once Upon a Time, where she serves as the love interest of Rumplestiltskin (who is the show's version of the Beast). She is portrayed by Australian actress Emilie de Ravin. Another live-action version of the character appeared in the 2015 television film Descendants, where she was played by Keegan Connor Tracy and serves as the Queen of the United States of Auradon, and along with Beast have a son called Ben. She return in the film's sequels Descendants 2 (2017) and Descendants 3 (2019). The series Sofia the First included a cameo by Belle in a 2013 episode. British actress Amy Jackson who portrayed as Belle opposite Indian actor Vikram, who being portrayed as Beast for sequences in a dreamy song "Ennodu Nee Irundhal" in the 2015 Tamil language romantic thriller I. The original prosthetic make-up for the characters were provided by Sean Foot (Shaun) and Davina Lamont and additional works were done by National Film Award winners—Christien Tinsley and Dominie Till.

Beauty and the Beast (2017 film)

In January 2015, Emma Watson announced that she would be portraying Belle in a live-action version of the film, which was released in 2017. Beauty and the Beast was the first of the Disney remakes in which an A-list actress portrays a Disney princess. As a feminist and model, Watson suggested several changes to the character in the live-action film. For the costume design, Watson rejected the traditional "big princess dress" and corset for the golden gown as that would have reduced her mobility, with the gown seen as crucial for marketing the film, while for the village scenes she requested boots instead of ballet slippers to give the character more ruggedness. Nonetheless, Belle's attire in the live-action remake largely stays true to its animated predecessor.

Thanks to Watson's influence, Belle is not only a bookworm but also an inventor like her father – she uses her inventions for everyday chores such as laundry, which in turn provides her with time to pursue her passion for reading. It is also revealed that Belle's mother died of a disease plague during Belle's infancy, consequently Maurice is somewhat overprotective of Belle and does not allow her to leave the village. For instance, Maurice creates "music boxes playing tunes from faraway places, in a bid to sate her thirst for exploration", as he is unwilling to let Belle be adventurous due to her mother's death, although Belle harbors no hard feelings about this. Watson's portrayal of Belle won her the MTV Movie Award for Best Performance at the 2017 MTV Movie & TV Awards and the Teen Choice Award for Choice Movie Actress – Sci-Fi/Fantasy at the 2017 Teen Choice Awards. She also received nominations for the Empire Award for Best Actress, the Nickelodeon Kids' Choice Award for "Favorite Movie Actress" and the Saturn Award for Best Actress.

Broadway musical

Belle appeared in the Broadway musical adaptation of Beauty and the Beast. The role was originated by actress Susan Egan, who was initially reluctant to audition for Beauty and the Beast because she "thought it was a terrible idea for Disney to put a cartoon on Broadway." However, her agent managed to convince her otherwise, and Egan ultimately turned down callbacks for roles in the musicals My Fair Lady, Carousel and Grease in favor of starring as Belle in Beauty and the Beast because she had always wanted to originate a Broadway role. Egan had never watched Beauty and the Beast prior to her audition, relying solely on "her own creative instincts" instead. Egan's performance earned her a Tony Award nomination for Best Actress in a Musical at the 48th Tony Awards. A total of seventeen actresses have portrayed Belle in the Broadway musical, among them recording artists Debbie Gibson and Toni Braxton, Tony Award nominees Kerry Butler and Andrea McArdle, The Sopranos' Jamie-Lynn Sigler, and Disney Channel alumnae Christy Carlson Romano and Anneliese van der Pol, the latter of whom became Broadway's final Belle when the show ended its thirteen-year-long run in 2007. Actress Sarah Litzsinger remains Broadway's longest-running Belle.

A best-selling R&B singer, Braxton made her Broadway debut when she was cast as Belle in 1998, turning down actress Halle Berry's role in the film Why Do Fools Fall In Love (1998). Braxton's desire to pursue an acting career stemmed from a series of conflicts with the singer's record label at the time, in turn making her the only African American to portray Belle in the show's history. Belle's ballad "A Change in Me" was written by songwriters Alan Menken and Tim Rice specifically for Braxton. However, the song was ultimately so well-received that it has been included in the musical ever since. During her tenure as Belle, Braxton was stalked by an "obsessed fan." The stalker had reportedly "bombarded" Braxton with threatening e-mails and letters. Several measures were taken to ensure the singer's safety, including forcing Braxton to dress in full disguise when traveling to and from the theatre in addition to reducing her total number of weekly performances from eight to seven. The stalker was eventually arrested and charged with "aggravated harassment."

Miscellaneous

Belle, along with Beast and Chip, appeared at the 64th Academy Awards as presenters for Best Animated Short Feature. She also makes a brief cameo appearance in The Hunchback of Notre Dame (1996) during the "Out There" musical sequence.

She was featured as one of the seven Princesses of Heart in the Kingdom Hearts video game series. She appears in the titles Kingdom Hearts, Kingdom Hearts: Chain of Memories, Kingdom Hearts II, Kingdom Hearts 358/2 Days, and Kingdom Hearts χ.

Belle was also the main character in various comic books based on the film, including one set during Belle's stay at the castle published by Marvel Comics, and a prequel set several years before the film distributed by Disney Comics. In the former, the storylines generally have the servants trying to coax Belle into doing something with the Beast, only for it to backfire and nearly ruin their friendship before they make up. In the latter serial, Belle ends up locked up in a cellar by village children after reluctantly playing pirates with them, and later nearly goes down the path leading to Beast's castle. The latter serial also implies that she holds misandric views and refuses to associate herself with the village children, especially the males, due to their not being as well-versed in literature as she is.

Belle and the other characters from the first film appear in the stage show, Beauty and the Beast Live on Stage at Disney's Hollywood Studios, Walt Disney World. Belle, along with the Beast, appears in a meet-and-greet attraction at Magic Kingdom's Fantasyland called Enchanted Tales with Belle, along with meet-and-greets in all of the other parks worldwide. 

Belle appears as a playable character to unlock for a limited time in the video game Disney Magic Kingdoms.

Belle, alongside the other Disney Princesses, appeared in the film Ralph Breaks the Internet, as was announced at the 2017 D23 Expo, with Paige O'Hara returning to the role after seven years.

H.E.R. portrayed Belle in a live-action/animation special Beauty and the Beast: A 30th Celebration that aired on ABC on December 15, 2022.

Reception

Critical response
Belle has received largely positive reviews from film critics, who praised her bravery, intelligence, independence, and maturity. Jennie Punter of The Globe and Mail described Belle as a "smart, courageous ... 'take-charge kind of gal'", crowning her the film's "main attraction". Both Emma Cochrane of Empire and Annlee Ellingson of Paste enjoyed the character's feminism, with the former hailing Belle as "more rounded than previous Disney characters". According to Stephen Hunter of The Baltimore Sun, Belle is "no passive fairy tale princess, but a real live girl, with a spunky personality and her own private agenda". A reviewer for TV Guide felt the film's familiar plot was improved by Belle's confidence and independence, concluding, "Unlike Disney heroines ... Belle is smart, knows what she wants, and doesn't spend her time pining away for the love of a handsome prince". Marc Bernardin of Entertainment Weekly dubbed Belle "the hero" of Beauty and the Beast, while the same publication's Christian Blauvelt opined, "Unlike previous Disney heroines who needed to be rescued by a prince themselves, Belle not only saves the Beast's life, she saves his soul". TLC's Vicki Arkoff reviewed Belle a "smart" and "sharp-tongued", crediting the character with "break[ing] Disney's passive-princess mold". About.com's David Nusair described Belle as an "admirable" heroine. AllMovie's Don Kaye and Perry Seibert echoed each other's reviews of the character, with Kaye describing both Belle and the Beast as "three-dimensional ... complex individuals who defy stereotyping and change over the course of the story", and Seibert calling Belle a "strong female character" who "sidesteps most of the clichés surrounding Disney heroines". Common Sense Media hailed Belle as "one of Disney's smartest, most independent heroines".

Several critics also voiced their preference for the character over her immediate predecessor, Ariel. Hal Hinson of The Washington Post described Belle as a "compelling" character who is "more mature, more womanly and less blandly asexual" than Ariel, as well as "a more worldly girl", describing her as "a bookworm, with gumption and a mind of her own". Similarly comparing Belle to Ariel, John Hartl of The Seattle Times wrote that, in Beauty and the Beast, "there's rarely a sense of déjà vu, perhaps because the heroine is so different from 'Mermaid's' dependent Ariel, and her dilemma is more poignant", while Boxoffice scribed, "Undoubtedly in response to criticism that the cute little 'Mermaid' Ariel was nothing more than a precocious sexpot, the idea-people behind this beauty—aptly named Belle ... chose to make her an icon of self-reliance and a voracious reader with a curiosity and love for everything around her". 

Meanwhile, Belle's relationship with the Beast has also been met with positive reviews. About.com's David Nusair wrote that "the palpable chemistry between Belle and The Beast ensur[es] that Beauty and the Beast lives up to its reputation as one of the most memorable romances of all time." Describing it as an "unconventional romance," Charles Solomon of the Los Angeles Times opined, "The idea of a young woman learning to love a gentle heart hidden beneath a baleful exterior represented a major break with tradition." Likewise, critics enjoyed O'Hara's performance. According to Variety, Belle was "magnificently voiced by O’Hara." The Star-Ledger's Stephen Whitty enjoyed O'Hara's "pretty soprano." John Hartl of The Seattle Times wrote, "O'Hara does a spirited job of investing the character with warmth, intuition and maturity," while the Sun-Sentinel's Candice Russel felt that O'Hara "does a good job of creating Belle as intellectual, wisely feminine and disarmed by the stirrings of her heart." 

One of the character's few negative reviews was written by Ethan Alter of Television Without Pity, who opined:

Emma Watson's portrayal as Belle in the 2017 film was generally well received by critics. A. O. Scott of The New York Times wrote that Watson "perfectly embodies Belle’s compassion and intelligence." The Washington Posts Ann Hornaday complimented Watson's performance, describing it as "alert and solemn" while noting her singing ability as "serviceable enough to get the job done." Richard Roeper of Chicago Sun-Times also lauded Watson's performance writing that she "is all pluck and spunk and sass and smarts and fierce independence as Belle." Stephen Whitty of the New York Daily News described Watson's portrayal of Belle as "breakthrough." While Tim Robey of The Daily Telegraph did not find Watson to be "a flawless Belle," he did overall say that "she’s good: that girl-next-door winsomeness and a sweet, clear singing voice see her through." He also remarked her portrayal of Belle as "dazzles" and "ideal." For her performance as Belle, Watson won the MTV Movie Award for Best Performance as well as the Teen Choice Award for Choice Movie Actress – Sci-Fi/Fantasy. She also received nominations for the Empire Award for Best Actress, the Saturn Award for Best Actress, and the Nickelodeon Kids' Choice Award for Favorite Movie Actress.

Feminist analysis
Feminist critics have argued both for and against whether Belle should be considered a positive depiction of a feminist character, with Disney affirmatively promoting the character as a feminist since 1991. Jezebel determined that Belle "is often held up as the standard of the 'feminist' Disney princess". According to Tales, Then and Now: More Folktales as Literary Fictions for Young Adults author Anna E. Altmann, Disney heavily promoted Beauty and the Beast as "a feminist fairy tale" due to Belle's characterization and role in the film. In his book Hearing a Film, Seeing a Sermon: Preaching and Popular Movies, author Timothy B. Cargal agreed that the character indicated "Disney's ... continued efforts to reshape their heroines for a more feminist age." According to Girl Culture: An Encyclopedia author Claudia Mitchell, Belle's feminism was influenced by third-wave feminism and the relatively new concept of Girl power during the 1990s. Critics have been generally mixed in their analyses of Belle, arguing over whether or not the character is in fact "feminist enough". Although Beauty and the Beast was initially lauded upon release for starring a "forward thinking and feminist" heroine, critics tend to agree that, in spite of Belle's independence and resentment towards Gaston, Beauty and the Beast essentially remains a romance about a girl who finally "meets her ideal man." Acknowledging that Belle "represented significant change from [her] sweet, mop-wielding predecessors," Twilight and History author Nancy Reagin observed that "the end result of fulfillment through marriage has been maintained." Kathleen Maher of The Austin Chronicle cited Belle as an example of "pseudo-feminism" because she rejects one man, Gaston, in favor of another, a prince. While commending Belle for "seeing past the beast's appearance," Judith Welikala of The Independent in the end accused the character of "melting back into the role of wife when he turns back into a handsome prince." Fairy Tale author Andrew Teverson referred to Belle as Disney's attempt to address "feminist criticism of its representation of women in earlier films," but ultimately criticized the character's curiosity for "extend[ing] only to romance," additionally accusing her of being "a zealous individualist with a pathological hostility to common men and women". Meanwhile, Stylist ranked Belle among the most feminist Disney characters, describing her as an "incredibly intelligent" woman who "doesn't stand for a man who considers her as just a piece of meat ... she wants someone who loves her for her mind too." Acknowledging the character's "feminist longings," Daniel Eigen, author of America's Film Legacy: The Authoritative Guide to the Landmark Movies in the National Film Registry, cited Belle as Disney's "modern-day corrective to Snow White." Beyond Adaptation: Essays on Radical Transformations of Original Works author Phyllis Frus wrote that, initially, Beauty and the Beast does not seem "remotely feminist." However, the author did acknowledge Belle as "an appealing character with a noticeable feminist streak," but in the end criticized Disney's Consumer Products of reversing what the film had nearly accomplished by inducting the character into the Disney Princess franchise. In Refinery29's "Definitive Ranking Of Disney Princesses As Feminist Role Models," author Vanessa Golembewski ranked the character eighth but described her personality and ambitions as "confusing." Complexs Tara Aquino described Belle as "a kinda feminist ... who's well-read, self-sufficient, and with standards high enough that she doesn't fall for the town's brain-dead pretty boy."

Commentators have generally reacted more cynically towards Belle's relationship with the film's male characters, particularly the Beast, questioning its morality. Writing for the University of Central Florida, Faith Dickens felt that after Belle's introduction, the character becomes little more than "a vehicle for exploring the Beast's dilemmas," while her initial pining for adventure is replaced by romance. Dickens went on to criticize the fact that while Belle appears to be "perfect the way she is," the Beast "need[s] to be reformed." Anna E. Altmann, author of Tales, Then and Now: More Folktales as Literary Fictions for Young Adults, disliked the fact that Belle appears to share a motherly relationship with both the Beast and Maurice. Altman also panned the fact that Belle's interest in reading appears to be limited to fairy tales, ultimately dismissing the character as little more than "a feisty North American version of" Beaumont's heroine. Orange Coast writer Henry A. Giroux felt that Belle serves as little more than "a prop for resolving the Beast's problems." Sonia Saraiya of Nerve ranked Belle the sixth-most feminist Disney Princess, writing that, unlike Ariel, "Belle's sass doesn't come from teenage rebellion, but rather from intellectual acuity." Saraiya commended Belle for resisting "her village's expectations of what her life should look like," crediting her with being "the first princess to express some skepticism about married life." While calling Belle's sacrifice "brave," the author also labeled it "not much of a step for womankind," in the end accusing her of falling "for a domineering man." Similarly, Kit Steinkellner of HelloGiggles.com expressed concern over the "abusive undercurrents running through Belle and Beast’s relationship." Meanwhile, Bustle's Mary Grace Garis also commended Belle's aspirations and love of reading, but criticized her relationship with the Beast, concluding, "Though the ’90s showed a move toward princesses wanting to buck conventions and free themselves from their fathers (or the town misogynist) the endgame is the still the same, elaborating, "When the movie ends, they’re still solidly with a man, their dreams of adventure abandoned. Therefore, the Disney renaissance is characterized more by theoretical want of adventure rather than a genuine pursuit."

Impact and legacy 
Deemed an "iconoclast" by Boxoffice Pro, Belle has been established as a cultural icon for her role in Beauty and the Beast. According to Time and Harper's Bazaar, the character holds the distinction of being Disney's first feminist princess. Commentators believe the character's reputation as one of Disney's first strong female characters is responsible for changing the way in which women would be depicted in subsequent animated films. According to Kevin Fallon of The Daily Beast, before Belle "being a Disney princess meant singing songs about how much you love combing your hair with a fork and giving away your voice if it meant you got to marry the guy with that dreamy chiseled jaw." Charles Solomon of the Los Angeles Times considers Belle to be among four Disney Princesses responsible for breaking "the bonds of convention". About.com's David Nusair agreed that Belle successfully "updated the princess formula for an entirely new generation". The Atlantic's Lindsay Lowe echoed Nusair's sentiment, citing Belle as the character responsible for ending Disney's "history of ... docile heroines". Cathy Schmidt of The Daily Campus recognized Belle and Ariel as "the beginnings of the more modern Disney princesses". Writing for Virgin Media, Limara Salt believes that the character "proved that audiences could fall in love with a brown-haired intellectual". A survey conducted by Disney after the film's release determined that Belle's love of books inspired young women to read. Justin Humphreys of The Hook expressed, "Belle remains a most successful princess because people can relate" to her. Elina Bolokhova of Parenting believes that Belle's "bravery and independence helped redefine the meaning of a Disney princess". 

Belle is the fifth member of the Disney Princess franchise, and one of its most popular and celebrated characters. According to Tyler B. Searle of Collider, who ranked the character the second best protagonist of the Disney Renaissance, Belle is often considered to be "one of if not the best Disney princesses". According to Justine McGrath of Teen Vogue, Belle has "become one of the most popular classic Disney princesses of all time". According to a 2020 poll conducted by PlayLikeMum, as reported by Marie Claire, Belle was voted the most popular Disney Princess in nine countries. Commending her intelligence and humility, the character was placed at number one on E!'s ranking of the Disney Princesses, while Cosmopolitan ranked her fourth. In the magazine's "Definitive Ranking Of Disney Princesses", Seventeen ranked Belle fifth. Similarly, BuzzFeed also ranked the character fifth, praising her love of reading. A reader poll conducted by BuzzFeed also determined that Belle is the most popular Disney Princess, having garnered 18% of votes. A similar poll conducted by ComingSoon.net also ranked Belle as the best Disney Princess, with 17% of the vote. Belle is the fifth most successful Disney Princess in terms of box office revenue, with Beauty and the Beast having grossed over $350 million. However, Belle was the lowest-selling Disney Princess on eBay in 2013, with sales of less than $7,000 despite the fact that she is often cited as a customer favorite.

Belle is considered to be one of Disney's most beloved animated heroines and princesses. Chhavi Puri of Pinkvilla reported that Belle "is often regarded as one of the best female Disney characters". Business Insider readers voted Belle the 15th most iconic female film character of all-time. In 2016, Scott Huver of People said the character's "popularity remains a force to be reckoned with" over 25 years after the film's release. Belle was the only animated heroine nominated for the American Film Institute's greatest film heroes ranking, from which only eight female characters were included on the final list. CNN ranked Belle one of Disney's greatest heroines. According to the Daily Mirror, Belle is Disney's second most iconic character, behind only Mickey and Minnie Mouse, describing her as a "portrait of bravery, teaching us to look beyond appearances and stand up for what we believe in". Meanwhile, PopMatters ranked Belle Disney's second best hero. Considered to be both a sex symbol and fashion icon, the character was ranked 64th on UGO's list of the most attractive female cartoon characters, while being ranked 14th on Complex's "25 Hottest Cartoon Women of All Time". E! ranked Belle the second best-dressed Disney Princess, crowning her "the most couture of all the Disney princesses". Belle's golden ball gown is widely considered to be one of the most famous dresses in film history. Belle appeared on Stylist's list of the "Best beauty looks in Disney" twice, both for the character's hairstyles. , Entertainment Weekly ranked Belle's hair seventh in the magazine's "Disney Princesses: Ranking Their Hairdos – and Don'ts!"

Belle helped establish Woolverton as a prolific screenwriter, who has since been commended for her dedication to creating strong female characters. Ever since Belle, the majority of Woolverton's female characters have been headstrong, independent women, namely Nala from The Lion King (1994), Mulan from Mulan (1998), Alice from Alice in Wonderland (2010), and Maleficent from Maleficent (2014). Susan Wloszczyna of IndieWire wrote that Woolverton's Belle "set a new standard for fully fleshed-out fairy-tale heroines", in turn paving the way for Katniss Everdeen from The Hunger Games series, and Anna and Elsa from Frozen (2013). Woolverton remains protective of Belle, explaining, "[she] was my first-born child, so there’s a little bit of possessiveness, which really I had to let it go". In Beauty and the Beast, Belle performs the film's opening number, "Belle," which was nominated for the Academy Award for Best Original Song at the 64th Academy Awards in 1992. In 1998, O'Hara was nominated for an Annie Award for Outstanding Achievement for Voice Acting in a Feature Production for reprising her role as Belle in the second of Beauty and the Beast's three direct-to-video sequels, Belle's Magical World. To commemorate her work on Beauty and the Beast and various contributions to Disney, O'Hara was honored with a Disney Legends award on August 19, 2011. Disney hired Spanish actress Penélope Cruz to pose as Belle in photographer Annie Leibovitz's Disney Dream Portrait Series.

References

External links

Belle at Disney.com

Disney Princess characters
Beauty and the Beast (franchise) characters
Female characters in animated films
Film characters introduced in 1991
Animated characters introduced in 1991
Fictional French people
Female characters in film
Teenage characters in film
Teenage characters in musical theatre
Female characters in musical theatre
Fictional prisoners and detainees
Fictional bibliophiles